Alix, Princess de Ligne (Alix Marie Anne Antoinette Charlotte Gabrielle; 24 August 1929 – 11 February 2019) was the fourth daughter and youngest child of Charlotte, Grand Duchess of Luxembourg, and Felix of Bourbon-Parma. She was, by birth, Princess of Luxembourg, Princess of Nassau and Princess of Bourbon-Parma. She was a sister of Grand Duke Jean and aunt of Grand Duke Henri.

World War II
Facing the German invasion in 10 May 1940 during World War II, the Grand Ducal Family of Luxembourg left the country to find refuge in Portugal, after receiving transit visas from the Portuguese consul Aristides de Sousa Mendes, in June 1940. They arrived at Vilar Formoso on 23 June 1940. After travelling through Coimbra and Lisbon, the family first stayed in Cascais, in Casa de Santa Maria, owned by Manuel Espírito Santo, who was then the honorary consul for Luxembourg in Portugal. By July they had moved to Monte Estoril, staying at the Chalet Posser de Andrade. On 10 July 1940, Princess Alix, together with her father Prince Félix, her siblings, Heir Prince Jean, Princess Elisabeth, Princess Marie Adelaide, Princess Marie Gabriele and Prince Charles, the nanny Justine Reinard and the chauffeur Eugène Niclou, along with his wife Joséphine, boarded the S.S. Trenton headed for New York City.

Marriage and issue
On 17 August 1950 in Luxembourg Princess Alix married Antoine, 13th Prince de Ligne, (8 March 1925 – 21 August 2005). They have issue:
 Michel, 14th Prince de Ligne (born 26 May 1951) married Princess Eleonora of Orléans-Braganza on 10 March 1981. They have two children and two grandchildren.
 Prince Wauthier de Ligne (born 10 July 1952 – 15 August 2022) – In 1976 he married Countess Regine de Renesse. They have three children and seven grandchildren.
 Princess Anne de Ligne (born 3 April 1954) – 1981 married Olivier Mortgat on 30 May 1981. They have two daughters.
 Princess Christine de Ligne (born 11 August 1955) – 1981 married Prince Antonio of Orléans-Braganza on 25 September 1981. They have four children and two grandchildren.
 Princess Sophie de Ligne (born 23 April 1957) married Count Philippe de Nicolay, son of Marie-Hélène de Rothschild on 26 June 1982. They have two sons.
 Prince Antoine Lamoral de Ligne (born 28 December 1959) married Countess Jacqueline de Lannoy on 16 June 2001. They have three children.
 Princess Yolande de Ligne (born 16 June 1964) married Hugo Townsend (born 1945), son of Group Captain Peter Townsend in 1994. They have four children.

Ancestry

References

1929 births
2019 deaths
Luxembourgian princesses
Princesses of Bourbon-Parma
House of Ligne
House of Nassau-Weilburg
People from Colmar-Berg
Princesses of Ligne
Daughters of monarchs